Rowan McNamara is an Aboriginal Australian actor, best known for his role in Samson and Delilah.

Career
McNamara's first acting role was in the 2009 Australian film, Samson and Delilah. He had the lead role in this film, playing the title character of Samson. His role led him to win an Inside Film Award for best actor and he was nominated for the best lead actor award in the 2009 Australian Film Institute Awards .

In 2015, McNamara received a suspended jail sentence for contravening a domestic violence order.

References

External links
 
 IMDB news for Rowan McNamara

Year of birth missing (living people)
Living people
Australian male film actors
Indigenous Australian male actors